Brigadier General Wilbard Shikongo is a retired Namibian military officer. His last command was as the Commandant of the Namibian Military School.

Career
His military career started in 1978 when he joined the People's Liberation Army of Namibia in exile. He received his basic military training and then specialized as a signaler at the Tobias Hainyeko Training Center in Lubango. In 1979 he was deployed to the Northern Front. He served until 1985 where he was sent to study a three-year military science. In 1988 he was again sent to the Soviet Union to Study for his Military Science Degree. In 1990 he was a pioneer of the NDF officer corps as he was inducted with the rank of Captain. He served in various capacities and ranks within the military. Shikongo was promoted to Brigadier General and appointed Commandant of the Namibian Military School in 14 April 2014, having succeeded Brig. Gen. Fredrick Siluzungila. At this occasion, he was promoted from Colonel to Brigadier General. He served in that position until February 2017 when Brig. Gen. Joshua Namhindo took over from him.

Honours and decorations
 Most Distinguished Order of Namibia: 4th Class Medal on Heroes' Day 2014

References

1957 births
Living people
Namibian military personnel
People's Liberation Army of Namibia personnel